The Adventures of Spawn is a spin-off of the popular Spawn comic book by Todd McFarlane.

References

External links
  Spawn.com Official Spawn website

2008 comics debuts
Image Comics titles
Spawn (comics)